Nayden Zelenogorsky (born September 2, 1961) is a Bulgarian politician and former mayor of the municipality of Pleven and a member of parliament.

References

1961 births
Living people
Bulgarian politicians
People from Pleven
University of National and World Economy alumni
Place of birth missing (living people)